Roland Vaughton (5 May 1914 – 5 January 1979) was an Australian cricketer. He played in six first-class matches for South Australia between 1946 and 1948.

See also
 List of South Australian representative cricketers

References

External links
 

1914 births
1979 deaths
Australian cricketers
South Australia cricketers
Cricketers from Adelaide